Old Times on the Mississippi is a memoir by Mark Twain. It was published in 1876. A serialized version of the work first appeared in the Atlantic Monthly Magazine published in 1875. It was later incorporated into his 1883 work, Life on the Mississippi.

External links 
 Online text from the "Documenting the American South" project at The University Library, The University of North Carolina at Chapel Hill.
 

Books by Mark Twain
1876 non-fiction books
Works originally published in The Atlantic (magazine)
Mississippi River
American memoirs
Literature first published in serial form